The Daniel C. Drucker medal was instituted in 1997 by the Applied Mechanics Division of the American Society of Mechanical Engineers.  The Drucker Medal is conferred in recognition of distinguished contributions to the fields of applied mechanics and mechanical engineering.
The award is given in honor of Daniel C. Drucker, who was internationally known for contributions to the theory of plasticity and its application to analysis and design in metal structures.
The recipient is given a medal and an honorarium.

Nomination procedure  
The Drucker Medal Committee consists of the five recent Drucker Medalists, the five members of the executive committee of the ASME International Applied Mechanics Division (AMD), and the five recent past chairs of the AMD.  Upon receiving recommendations from the international community of applied mechanics, the Committee nominates a single medalist every year.  This nomination is subsequently approved by the ASME; no case has been reported that the ASME has ever overruled a nomination of the Drucker Medal Committee.  See the list of current members of the Committee.

Recipients

Source: ASME
1998 Daniel C. Drucker
1999 Ascher H. Shapiro
2000 Philip G. Hodge, Jr.	
2001 Bruno A. Boley  	
2002 George J. Dvorak
2003 Leon M. Keer
2004 Frank A. McClintock
2005 Robert L. Taylor
2006 Alan Needleman 	
2007 Albert S. Kobayashi
2008 Thomas C.T. Ting
2009 James R. Barber
2010 Rohan Abeyaratne
2011 John W. Rudnicki
2012 James W. Dally
2013 Yonggang Huang, Northwestern University, USA.
2014 Lallit Anand, MIT
2015 Krishnaswami Ravi-Chandar, University of Texas at Austin
2016 Kyung-Suk Kim
2017 David M. Parks
2018 David M. Barnett
2019 John L. Bassani
2020 Glaucio H. Paulino
2021 Markus J. Buehler
2022 Horacio D. Espinosa, Northwestern University

See also
 Applied Mechanics Division
 American Society of Mechanical Engineers
 Applied mechanics
 Mechanician
 List of engineering awards
 List of mechanical engineering awards
 List of awards named after people

References
Information for nomination
Drucker Medal web page at ASME site
Daniel C. Drucker Obituary page

Awards established in 1997
Mechanical engineering awards
American awards
ASME Medals